Tombrell Battery was an artillery battery in Delimara, Marsaxlokk, Malta. It was built in around 1722 by the Order of Saint John as one of a series of coastal fortifications around the coasts of the Maltese Islands. The battery was demolished at the end of the 19th century, and only its rock-hewn ditch survives today.

History
Tombrell Battery was built on a small headland known as Tombrell Point, which is part of the Delimara peninsula. It is believed to have been built in around 1722, but its actual date of construction is not yet known. The battery consisted of a semi-circular gun platform, with guns mounted en barbette. Its land front was enclosed by an unusual combination of a redan and a blockhouse, and it was surrounded by a rock-hewn ditch. An irregular entrenchment wall flanked either side of the battery.

Tombrell Battery was demolished by the British military at the end of the 19th century to clear the line of fire of Wolseley Battery.

Present day
Today, only the battery's rock-hewn ditch can be seen. The site is covered by a small mound of rubble, and the battery's foundations are possibly buried underneath. An archaeological excavation would be required to study the site properly.

References

External links

National Inventory of the Cultural Property of the Maltese Islands

Batteries in Malta
Hospitaller fortifications in Malta
Buildings and structures completed in 1722
Buildings and structures demolished in the 19th century
Demolished buildings and structures in Malta
Marsaxlokk
Limestone buildings in Malta
National Inventory of the Cultural Property of the Maltese Islands
18th-century fortifications
1722 establishments in Malta
18th Century military history of Malta